Lockbridge is an unincorporated community in Summers County, West Virginia, United States, located south of Meadow Bridge.

The community derives its name from Lockridge Gwinn (a recording error by postal officials accounts for the error in spelling, which was never corrected).

References

Unincorporated communities in Summers County, West Virginia
Unincorporated communities in West Virginia